Tumbledown is a 1988 BBC Television drama film set during the Falklands War. Directed by Richard Eyre, it stars Colin Firth, Paul Rhys, and David Calder.

Synopsis
The film centres on the experiences of Robert Lawrence MC (played by Colin Firth), an officer of the Scots Guards during the Falklands War of 1982. While fighting at the Battle of Mount Tumbledown, Lawrence is shot in the head by an Argentine sniper, and left paralysed on his left side. He then must learn to adjust to his new disability.

Awards
BAFTA TV Awards 1989
Won: Best Film Cameraman: Andrew Dunn
Won: Best Make Up: Shaunna Harrison
Won: Best Single Drama: Richard Broke, Richard Eyre & Charles Wood
Nominated: Best Actor: Colin Firth
Nominated: Best Costume Design: Michael Burdle
Nominated: Best Design: Geoff Powell
Nominated: Best Film Editor: Ken Pearce
Nominated: Best Film Sound: Graham Ross, Ken Hams & Christopher Swanton
Nominated: Best Original Television Music: Richard Hartley
RTS Television Award 1989
Won: Best Actor (Male): Colin Firth
Won: Best Make Up Design: Shaunna Harrison
Won: Best Single Play: Charles Wood
Prix Italia 1988 Prix Italia, Winners 1949 - 2010, RAI

Reception
The film sparked enormous controversy when first broadcast in 1988, in part because it conveyed the flat indifference shown by government, society and public to the returning wounded from the Falklands War; this content forms much of the story, as Lawrence struggles to come to terms with his terrible injuries, and to face a life in which he cannot do the thing he is trained to do, the thing he loves: soldiering.

The film also triggered controversy by presenting an unvarnished portrait of the protagonist: for example, his joy in the brutalities of war and a flashback scene toward the end which shows him exulting at the top of Mount Tumbledown. The film portrays Lawrence's love of the military life as much as it portrays his feelings of abandonment and bitterness as he tries to cope with his wounds, with little help from the government that sent him into battle.

Lead actor Colin Firth is reported to have said that the political left and right hated the film because it did not conform to any fixed ideology.

Media information

DVD release
Released on Region 2 DVD by BBC Video on 2007-03-26.
The series was included in The Falklands 25th Commemorative Box Set with The Falklands Play.

Script book

  Paperback edition (28 April 1988). Penguin Books.

See also
The Falklands Play
An Ungentlemanly Act
Cultural impact of the Falklands War

References

External links

Battle for Life by Robert Fox from Radio Times (28 May - 3 June 1988)
 

1988 television films
1988 films
British television films
1980s English-language films
Falklands War films
Anti-war films
Prix Italia winners
Films directed by Richard Eyre
1988 in British television
1980s political films
1980s war films